Aloisia Wagner (born 1905/1906, date of death unknown), better known by her stage name Violetta, was a German-American woman who was born without legs or arms with a condition known as tetra-amelia syndrome. She was born in Hemelingen, Germany, and had a lengthy career in sideshow performance.

Aloisia Wagner was born in either 1905 or 1906. The exact date of birth is unknown.

According to the ship manifest, Aloisia had blonde hair and green eyes, was 3 feet tall, and was allowed into the U.S. for 25 weeks to work for Samuel W. Gumpertz in his Dreamland Circus Side Show. She was the daughter of Elise Wagner, of Hemelingen, Moltkestr. 26 (map). The manifest's "Held For Special Inquiry" page shows that both were held (in hospital) for one day before being allowed to enter the U.S. Other pages of the manifest from this ship list many members of the John Robinson Circus, which was later acquired by John Nicholas Ringling, Violetta's later employer.

For many years Aloisia performed in several sideshows and Freak shows as a singer and oddity, including Coney Island's Dreamland, the Ringling Bros. and Barnum & Bailey Circus, and the Mighty Haag Circus. A 1925 photo (shown on page) shows her performing at the World Museum (freak show) in Los Angeles. According to his biography, famed writer Jean Cocteau visited Violetta at Luna Park, Paris in 1927, describing her as "a stubborn German woman." In 1929, the Belgium surrealist journal Variétés published a photo of Violetta.

Wallace Stort of the  wrote of her several times. Stort's 1940 article is the last known publication referencing Violetta, describing in detail how she moved herself by hopping from place to place on the bottom of her torso, and was able to manipulate objects with her mouth enough to comb her own hair, dress herself, thread a needle, and sew. Stort also stated that Violetta was married and wore her wedding band on a gold chain around her neck, though no other information about her husband can be found.

See also
Prince Randian, (1871–1934) American limbless sideshow performer, who appeared in film Freaks in 1932.
Nick Vujicic, a Christian evangelist and motivational speaker
Hirotada Ototake, a sports writer.

References

External links

Violetta at quasi-modo.net
Violetta at Phreeque.com
New York Times article on Coney Island

1900s births
Year of death missing
Sideshow performers
People with tetra-amelia syndrome
German amputees
German emigrants to the United States
Entertainers from Bremen
German people with disabilities